Zarifa Mukharbekovna Sautieva (born 1 May 1978) is a museum director and political activist from Ingushetia. She was dismissed by the Russian government because of her protests about changes to the border between Chechnya and Ingushetia and then imprisoned.

Biography 

Sautieva was born on 1 May 1978. During her childhood she loved to read. Her family includes two sisters and one brother. She has a university degree and lived in Sunzha in the Republic of Ingushetia. She is a member of the Ingush Committee of the National Unity. Until November 2018 she was deputy director of the Memorial of Memory and Glory in Nazran, Ingushetia. She was particularly gifted in her museum work at community engagement. She was dismissed by the Russian government from her post as a response to her involvement in protests against changes to the border between Chechnya and Ingushetia.

Activism 
Sautieva was arrested on 27 March 2019 in Magas by police, after clashes with protesters. It is alleged that the protesters threw sticks, chairs and fences at police, after attempts were made to disperse the protest. Whilst Sautieva used social media to record protests, the recordings from March 2019 show her calling other protesters to order.

Sautieva was one of 33 people detained as a response to their role in the protests against the border. She is the only woman to be detained. She has been held in custody since 12 July 2019. She has been detained at a centre in Nalchik in Kabardino-Balkaria. She has claimed that whilst in detention, she and other protesters, are victims of psychological torture and physical violence. When asked to give a sample of handwriting during detention, she wrote out a poem by Osip Mandelstam. 

On 15/16 January 2020, Sautieva and other protesters were charged with participation in an extremist community. On 26 January a complaint was filed by lawyers from the Human Rights Centre in Ingushetia to the European Court of Human Rights about the conviction. On 27 March an open letter, signed by over 170 people, called for her release. This campaign was begun by fellow activist Leyla Gazdiyeva. As of March 2020, her trial was due to take place in private, and her family were barred from visiting her. The Council of Europe views her, and her fellow activists, as political prisoners held by the state.

References 

Living people
1978 births
Russian curators
Russian women curators
Ingush people
Russian activists
Russian women activists